Modiphius Entertainment is an RPG and tabletop game publisher based in Fulham, London. Modiphius was founded in 2012 by husband-wife team Rita and Chris Birch to publish their first game Achtung! Cthulhu. The company have since published a number of product lines based on independent licenses and established brands.

Games

Achtung! Cthulhu

In 2013 the company raised £177,000 through Kickstarter to create Achtung! Cthulhu, a tabletop RPG set in the Second World War inspired by the work of H.P. Lovecraft. The game was well-received in the RPG community, and won several awards, including Best Roleplaying Game at the 2014 UK Games Expo. In 2018 a videogame based on the franchise - called Achtung! Cthulhu Tactics - was released by Auroch Digital.

Mutant Chronicles
In 2013 Modiphius released the 3rd edition of popular post-apocalyptic RPG Mutant Chronicles.

Fallout
In 2017 the company acquired the license for Bethesda property Fallout and in 2018 released Fallout: Wasteland Warfare, a tabletop wargame featuring characters and settings from the videogame series. The company announced in 2019 that they would be working on an RPG expansion to Fallout: Wasteland Warfare to be released in the same year.

Modiphius would also develop a Fallout tabletop RPG using their 2d20 system called Fallout the Roleplaying Game. The game would enter beta in 2019 with a projected release in 2020, but was delayed due to the COVID-19 pandemic. Fallout the Roleplaying Game would release digitally in March 2021, with a physical release in July the same year.

Other Franchises
The company have released a number of games based on popular videogame and pop culture franchises:
 In 2014 the company released Thunderbirds, a co-operative board game designed by Matt Leacock based on the popular British children's TV show Thunderbirds.
 In 2015, the company announced a licensing deal for Robert E. Howard's Conan the Barbarian property, with the publication of a roleplaying game, Conan: Adventures in an Age Undreamed Of, and an ongoing line of supplements in that setting taking place beginning in February 2016.
 In 2017 the company released their first edition of Star Trek Adventures, an RPG series based on the television series Star Trek.
 In 2018 the company announced they would be working with Dreamworks Studios to produce a board game based on the children's films Kung Fu Panda.
 In the same year, they also announced a John Carter of Mars roleplaying game and line of supporting material, based on the early-1900s pulp science fantasy series of the same name by Edgar Rice Burroughs. The John Carter RPG began shipping in early 2019.
 In 2019 the company released a promotional miniature of the Dragonborn from The Elder Scrolls V: Skyrim, announcing that they were working on a skirmish level wargame based on the franchise.

References 

Companies based in London
British companies established in 2012
Entertainment companies established in 2012
Gaming organizations
2012 establishments in England